HMS Iphigenia was an  protected cruiser of the Royal Navy built on the River Clyde and launched in 1891. She was subsequently converted as a minelayer in the latter half of her career and ultimately sunk as a blockship during the Zeebrugge Raid on 23 April 1918.

History

Ordered under the Naval Defence Act 1889, Iphigenia was laid down in 1891 at the yard of the London and Glasgow Shipbuilding Company. She returned from duty on the China Station in 1906.

Along with a number of other ships of her class, as she became obsolete as a cruiser she was converted at Chatham Dockyard into a minelayer. This work was completed by August 1907. She was then based at Dover and Sheerness. In 1917 she was in use as a depot ship in the White Sea as part of the British North Russia Squadron.

She was sunk at the entrance to the Bruges Canal to try and prevent it being used by German U-Boats. She was subsequently broken up when the canal was cleared.

References

Publications

External links
 
HMS Iphigenia, Index of 19th Century Naval Vessels
HMS Iphigenia at Naval-History.net

 

Apollo-class cruisers
Ships built on the River Clyde
1891 ships
World War I cruisers of the United Kingdom